Nikolla (indefinite form Nikollë) is an Albanian first name and surname derived from the Greek Nikolaos (Νικόλαος). It is commonly used by Albanian Christians. The name was popularised amongst Albanians by Saint Nicholas.

First name
Nikolla Zoraqi, Albanian composer, (1928–1991)
Nikolla Ivanaj, Albanian publisher and writer from the Kingdom of Montenegro, (1879–1951)

Surname
Millosh Gjergj Nikolla, Albanian poet and writer from Shkodër, (13 October 1911–26 August 1938)
Lindita Nikolla, Albanian politician from Tirana, (22 October 1965–)

Albanian-language surnames
Albanian masculine given names
Patronymic surnames
Surnames from given names